Scudder Peak is a small rock peak just southwest of Spitz Ridge on the south side of Toney Mountain, Marie Byrd Land. Mapped by United States Geological Survey (USGS) from ground surveys and U.S. Navy air photos, 1959–66. Named by Advisory Committee on Antarctic Names (US-ACAN) for Brent E. Scudder, meteorologist at Byrd Station in 1966.

Mountains of Marie Byrd Land